Maine elected its members September 8, 1828.  Maine required a majority vote for election, so the  district election was settled on the second ballot on December 22, 1828, and the  district election was settled on the sixth ballot on April 5, 1830, near the end of the next Congress.

See also 
 1829 Maine's 4th congressional district special election
 1828 and 1829 United States House of Representatives elections
 List of United States representatives from Maine

Notes

References 

United States House of Representatives elections in Maine
Maine
Maine
Maine
United States House of Representatives
United States House of Representatives
United States House of Representatives